Aiki, a Japanese budō term, at its most basic is a principle that allows a conditioned practitioner to negate or redirect an opponent's power.  When applied, the  practitioner controls the actions of the attacker with minimal effort and with a distinct absence of muscular tension usually associated with physical effort.

Etymology
In Japanese Aiki is formed from two kanji:
 合 – ai – joining
 氣 – ki – spirit
The kanji for  represents a pot filled with steaming rice and a lid on it. Hence,  symbolizes energy (in the body).

Thus 's meaning is to fit, join, or combine energy. However, care must be taken about the absolute meanings of words when discussing concepts derived from other cultures and expressed in different languages. This is particularly true when the words we use today have been derived from symbols, in this case, Japanese kanji, which represent ideas rather than literal translations of the components. Historical use of a term can influence meanings and be passed down by those wishing to illustrate ideas with the best word or phrase available to them. In this way, there may be a divergence of the meaning between arts or schools within the same art. The characters  and  have translations to many different English words.

Historically, the principle of  would be primarily transmitted orally, as such teachings were often a closely guarded secret. In modern times, the description of the concept varies from the physical to vague and open-ended, or more concerned with spiritual aspects.

Martial arts

 lends its name to various Japanese martial arts, most notably Aikido, and its parent art, Daito-ryu aiki-jujutsu.

Concept
 is a complex concept, and three aspects have been used to describe it in relation to a martial situation:

1) Blending, not clashing

  typically describes an idea of oneness or blending in the midst of combat. In aikido it generally describes the more elevated notion of blending rather than clashing. Many definitions for  seem to be based around  due to the complexity of the word usage in a particular Japanese context; the exact English interpretation would be hard to describe. Emphasis is upon joining with the rhythm and intent of the opponent in order to find the optimal position and timing with which to apply force. To blend with an attack, many believe it is necessary to yield to incoming forces but basic practitioners of  understand that there is a difference between 'blending' and 'giving way', and they instead train to 'take the line' of attack subtly and control it.  is closely related to the principle of ju though the latter places more emphasis on the active physical manipulation on a mechanical structural level.

2) Leading the assailant

The  practitioner is able to lead the attack, and thus the attacker, into precarious positions. The influence over an assailant grows as the assailant's balance deteriorates.  Body movements (tai sabaki) used for this may be large and obvious or small and subtle, internally generated movements. Subtle weight shifting and the application of physical pressure to the assailant enables one to lead them, keep them static, or keep them unbalanced (kuzushi) in order to employ one's own technique. In the same manner, through deceptive movements, the  practitioner may negate a defence response from the assailant or create a defence response from the assailant that puts them even further into peril. There is a strong degree of intent, will or psychology to this aspect of domination. Mind and body are coordinated.

3) Use of internal strength – Ki energy

 Kiai and  use the same kanji (transposed) and can be thought of as the inner and the outer aspect of the same principle.  relates to the manifestation, emission or projection of one's own energy externally (external strength), while  relates to one's own energy internally (internal strength). Thus  is the union of external energies while  is the union of internal energies. This use of  will involve the use of  power, i.e. breathing is coordinated with movement.  is the natural power that can be produced when body and consciousness (mind) are unified. The term  (呼吸) can also be used to describe a situation in which two opponents are moving with appropriate timing.

Thoughts on the concept 
 is considered to be an ancient practice, and its practice is often kept within a particular individual or two from a family/school lineage. Culturally, and due to certain necessities of the time period, the  knowledge was usually a very well-guarded secret and rarely disclosed.

The oldest book to have historically discussed  was the 1899 Budo Hiketsu-Aiki no Jutsu. On the subject of  it was written:

{{cquote|The most profound and mysterious art in the world is the art of aiki. This is the secret principle of all the martial arts in Japan. One who masters it can be an unparalleled martial genius.}}

The Textbook of Jujutsu (Jujutsu Kyoju-sho Ryu no Maki'') from 1913 stated:

References

Aikido
 
Japanese martial arts terminology